Cameroceras ("chambered horn") is a genus of extinct, large orthoconic cephalopod that lived mainly during the Ordovician period. It first appears during the middle Ordovician, around 470 million years ago, and was a fairly common component of the fauna in some places during the period, inhabiting the shallow seas of Laurentia, Baltica and Siberia. Its diversity and abundance became severely reduced following the Ordovician–Silurian extinction events, and the last remnants of the genus went extinct sometime during the Wenlock.

Description
Cameroceras is a cephalopod, a taxon of molluscs that includes the octopuses, squids and cuttlefish. From comparison with living cephalopods, particularly the shelled chambered nautilus, some inferences about the biology of Cameroceras can be made. The head of the animal would have been soft muscular tissue situated at the opening of the hard cone-like shell, with the mantle (main body) lying within the shell for protection. Tentacles would have grown from the base of the head like in a modern nautilus, and these tentacles would have been used to seize and manipulate prey. At the base of these tentacles within the buccal mass (analogous to the mouth) a hard keratinous beak would have bitten into the bodies of its prey, and is assumed to have been strong enough to breach the prey's exoskeleton or shell. Within the beaks of modern cephalopods a radula, or 'toothed' tongue is used to rasp out soft tissue from within the prey's shell.

Taxonomic usage

Cameroceras has become a "wastebasket taxon" in which large orthoconic endocerids such as Endoceras, Vaginoceras, and Meniscoceras were originally placed. This makes it extremely difficult to describe Cameroceras as a distinct genus. Although the type species Cameroceras trentonense was first described by Conrad in 1842, since then the generic term has had variable meaning.

Hall, who named and described Endoceras in 1847 recognized C. trentonense specifically, but used Endoceras for other specimens of large endocerids from the Trenton Limestone of western New York state. Cameroceras and Endoceras have even been applied to different stages of the same species. Although Cameroceras takes precedence where the two refer to the same species, its vague application leaves Endoceras or other better-described genus the term of choice.

Paleobiology

The lifestyle and habits of Cameroceras can only be surmised. They were almost certainly stalkers and ambush predators that moved across the sea floor or lay in wait. The large rigid shell would have made maneuvering difficult. The larger ones especially were probably not active swimmers. The very largest may have remained on the bottom without ever changing position.

As with all endoceratids Cameroceras was weighted so as to be horizontally stable. This would have been achieved by the endocones in the apical portion of the siphuncle that would have compensated for the visceral mass forward in the body chamber. The endocones would also have sealed off the more apical chambers from the siphuncle limiting changes in ballast to the more forward, centrally located, chambers. The result is that changes in buoyancy would have had little effect on horizontal stability.

See also

Cephalopod size

References

Further reading
 Clarke, J.M. 1897. The Lower Silurian Cephalopoda of Minnesota. In: E.O. Ulrich, J.M. Clarke, W.H. Scofield & N.H. Winchell  The Geology of Minnesota. Vol. III, Part II, of the final report. Paleontology. Harrison & Smith, Minneapolis. pp. 761–812.
 Flower, Rousseau H. 1955. Status of Endoceroid Classification. Journal of Paleontology 29: 329–371.
 Haines, Tim, & Chambers, Paul.  2005.  The Complete Guide to Prehistoric Life.  BBC Books, London.
 Sweet, Walter C.  Cephalopoda—General Features in Treatise on Invertebrate Paleontology, Part K, Mollusca 3.  Geological Society of America, and University of Kansas Press.  Page K5.
 Teichert, C.  1964.  Endoceratoidea in Treatise on Invertebrate Paleontology, Part K, Mollusca 3.  Geological Society of America, and University of Kansas Press.  Page K174.
 Teichert, C., and B. Kümmel 1960, Size of Endocerid Cephalopods; Breviora Mus. Comp. Zool. No. 128, 1–7.

Prehistoric nautiloid genera
Ordovician cephalopods of North America
Fossil taxa described in 1842
Paleozoic life of Ontario
Paleozoic life of Quebec
Taxa named by Timothy Abbott Conrad